Ayton is an English surname. Notable people with the surname include:

 Charles John Ayton (1846–1922), New Zealand miner and diarist
 David Ayton Sr. (1857–1931), Scottish golfer
 Deandre Ayton (born 1998), Bahamian basketball player
 Fanny Ayton (1806–1899), English opera singer
 Frank Ayton (1873–1936), English electrical engineer
 John Ayton (born c. 1963), British businessman
 Laurie Ayton Sr. (1884–1962), Scottish golfer
 Laurie Ayton Jr. (1914–1989), Scottish golfer
 Philip Ayton (born 1947), English squash player
 Richard Ayton (1786–1823), English dramatist and writer
 Robert Ayton (1915–1985), British artist and illustrator 
 Sarah Ayton (born 1980), English sailor
 William Alexander Ayton (1816–1909), British Anglican clergyman

See also
 Aiton (surname)
 Aytoun, includes a list of people with the surname